Law & Order: UK is a British police procedural and legal television programme, adapted from the American series Law & Order. The programme is financed by the production companies Kudos Film and Television, Wolf Films, and Universal Media Studios. Chris Chibnall, the first head writer, set the practice of adapting episodes from the American series, which continued after he left the production.  Through the eight series, 53 episodes have been borrowed from across the 456 episode American run, ranging from the first American episode being used in series 5 of Law & Order: UK, through a final (20th) season American episode used in series 3 of the UK version.

Law & Order: UK is based in London. The original cast consisted of Bradley Walsh, Freema Agyeman, Ben Daniels, Jamie Bamber, Bill Paterson, and Harriet Walter, whilst the final cast featured Walsh, Sharon Small, Ben Bailey Smith, Dominic Rowan, Georgia Taylor, and Peter Davison. Paul Nicholls and Paterson Joseph also starred.

The series premiered worldwide on ITV on Thursday 23 February 2009. As of 11 June 2014, a total of 53 episodes have been shown globally. Internationally, the programme is broadcast in thirteen-episode runs, however, in Britain, each thirteen-episode run is broadcast in two halves - one containing seven episodes, and the other containing the remaining six. This results in several episodes being broadcast in foreign countries months before their British broadcast. The series premiered in America on BBC America on October 3, 2010.

In June 2014, broadcaster ITV and producer Kudos issued a joint press release announcing that series 5 would be "the last to be transmitted for the foreseeable future".  By coincidence, the final episode aired the following week, delayed from its planned 30 April airdate due to a plot which incorporated events considered too similar to the 28 April murder of teacher Ann Maguire.

Series overview

Episodes

Series 1 (2009)

Series 2 (2010)

Series 3 (2011)

Series 4 (2013)

Series 5 (2014)

References

External links
 
 
 Law & Order: UK episode guide at BBCAmerica.com

Lists of British crime television series episodes
Lists of British drama television series episodes
Law & Order: UK